Qiaoxi District (桥西区) may refer to the following locations in Hebei, China:

Qiaoxi District, Shijiazhuang
Qiaoxi District, Xingtai
Qiaoxi District, Zhangjiakou